The Norway national under-21 football team, controlled by the Football Association of Norway, is the national football team of Norway for players of 21 years of age or under at the start of a UEFA European Under-21 Football Championship campaign. The team has reached the European Championship finals three times, in 1998 and 2013, winning bronze medals on both occasions and then in 2023.

Competitive record

UEFA European Under-21 Championship Record

Note: The year of the tournament represents the year in which it ends.

*Draws include knockout matches decided on penalty kicks.

Players

Current squad
 The following players were called up for the friendly matches.
 Match dates: 25 and 28 March 2023
 Opposition:  and 
 Caps and goals correct as of: 22 November 2022, after the match against .

Recent call-ups
The following players have also been called up within the last twelve months and remain eligible for selection.

Records

Leading appearancesNote: Club(s) represents the permanent clubs during the player's time in the Under-21s. Those players in bold are still eligible to play for the team.

Leading goalscorersNote: Club(s) represents the permanent clubs during the player's time in the Under-21s. The players in bold are still eligible to play for the team.

Past squads

1998 UEFA European Under-21 Championship squad
2013 UEFA European Under-21 Championship squad

Coaches1974:  Nils Arne Eggen1979–1985:  Egil Olsen1996–1998:  Nils Johan Semb2000–2003:  Per-Mathias Høgmo2003–2006:  Hallvar Thoresen2006–2010:  Øystein Gåre2010:  Tor Ole Skullerud2011–2013:  Per Joar Hansen2013:  Tor Ole Skullerud2014–present''':  Leif Gunnar Smerud

See also
Norway national football team
Norway national under-19 football team
Norway national under-17 football team
Norway women's national football team

References

External links 

 Norway U21-team at UEFA.com

European national under-21 association football teams
under-21